Olof Arenius (16 December 1701 – 5 May 1766) was a Swedish portrait painter.

Biography
Arenius was born in the parish of Bro in  Uppland, Sweden. His  father was a vicar in Upplands-Bro. After a period of theology studies at Uppsala University, he studied art under David von Krafft (1655–1724). In 1729, he went to the United Kingdom where he was exposed to the art of  portrait painters  Godfried Kneller  (1646–1723) and Mikael Dahl (1659–1743).

Returning to Sweden in 1736, he was named court painter  by King Frederick I of Sweden. He died at Stockholm in 1766. His portraits and miniatures in oil are much esteemed, and are to be found in all the public galleries, as well as in the best private collections, in Sweden. Many of them have been engraved.

Gallery

References

Attribution:
 

1701 births
1766 deaths
People from Uppland
 Uppsala University alumni
18th-century Swedish painters
18th-century Swedish male artists
Swedish male painters
Portrait miniaturists